Bonson is a commune in the Loire department in central France.

Population

Personalities
The church, the train station, as well as all the sports fields and all the surrounding houses were built thanks to the donation of land by Sylvain Girerd, at the time owner of the Noyers property, rue Sylvain Girerd.

See also
Communes of the Loire department

References

Communes of Loire (department)